Debbie Horton is an American guitarist, DJ and songwriter, who is the only woman to have ever played lead guitar for Johnny Cash.

Biography
Horton was born in Newport News, Virginia, United States.

During a concert near Baltimore, Maryland, Johnny Cash had heard that Debbie Horton was there and that she played lead guitar in a similar way to Luther Perkins. During the concert Cash called Horton out of the audience to join him on stage to perform a song with him. Cash sang "Big River", while Horton played lead guitar. Horton holds the distinction of being the only woman to have played lead guitar for Cash.

Horton has written many songs and two of her compositions were recorded by Pretty Miss Norma Jean and Wanda Jackson.

Latterly she was the co-host of a traveling show from Branson, Missouri, featuring a tribute to Johnny Cash.  She can be seen regularly on the RFD-TV television show, Midwest Country.  On May 27, 2016, Horton made her debut on the Grand Ole Opry.

References

Year of birth missing (living people)
Living people
American women guitarists
Place of birth missing (living people)
American radio DJs
American women songwriters
Songwriters from Virginia
American women radio presenters
21st-century American women